Bobsleigh at the 1980 Winter Olympics consisted of two events, at Mt. Van Hoevenberg Olympic Bobsled Run.  The competition took place between 15 and 24 February 1980.

Medal summary

Medal table

Two countries won medals in Lake Placid, with East Germany leading the medal table.

Events

Participating NOCs

Eleven nations participated in bobsleigh at the 1980 Games.

References

External links
Wallechinsky, David and Jaime Loucky (2009). "Bobsleigh". In The Complete Book of the Winter Olympics: 2010 Edition. London: Aurum Press Limited.

 
1980
1980 Winter Olympics events
1980 in bobsleigh